In mathematics, and in particular singularity theory, an  singularity, where  is an integer, describes a level of degeneracy of a function. The notation was introduced by V. I. Arnold.

Let  be a smooth function. We denote by  the infinite-dimensional space of all such functions. We define the group action as follows:

A function  is said to have a type -singularity if it lies in the orbit of

By a normal form we mean a particularly simple representative of any given orbit. The above expressions for  give normal forms for the type -singularities. The type -singularities are special because they are amongst the simple singularities, this means that there are only a finite number of other orbits in a sufficiently small neighbourhood of the orbit of .

References 

Singularity theory